Ophryotrocha puerilis is a species of marine polychaete worms in the order Eunicida. It is native to the northern Atlantic Ocean and the Mediterranean Sea and is the type species of the genus Ophryotrocha.

Biology
Ophryotrocha puerilis starts life as a male but later changes sex to female. Under certain circumstances it can change back to a male as a result of environmental cues; it switches sex if two female stages are put together, or if the tail of a female stage is removed, but it remains female if kept in isolation.

References

Polychaetes
Animals described in 1869